Pondus is a comic strip created by the Norwegian cartoonist Frode Øverli.  Since its start in 1995, it has become one of the most successful comic strips in Scandinavia.  It has been translated to several languages, including Danish, English, German, Finnish, French, Icelandic, Latin, Sami, Swedish and Esperanto.

In 2000 it inspired its own magazine.

Publication history
Øverli initially developed a strip titled A-laget (A-team) in 1995, prior to leaving the magazine Pyton. This early version focused on three characters who were fanatical football-supporters. By the time the strip in its earliest form was first published in a small local newspaper Vest-Nytt of Sotra on October 28, 1995, it had taken the name Pondus. In 1996 it began a four-year run as a supporting strip in the Norwegian magazine devoted to Bud Grace's Ernie, leading to its breakthrough on April 2, 1997, when it was taken on as a daily strip in national distribution newspaper Dagbladet.

On July 4, 2000, it began publication in its own Pondus magazine, as the first Norwegian strip to ever carry its own monthly publication. This was followed on June 6, 2001 with the launch of a Swedish sister magazine. The strip runs daily in more than 80 Norwegian newspapers, and is syndicated to several international publications, most notably Swedish Dagens Nyheter, Danish Berlingske Tidende, and Icelandic Frettabladid.

As of 2007's first issue, Pondus magazine left publisher Schibsted to continue its run with publisher Egmont. In a simultaneous event, the character Pondus quit his job as a bus driver, and bought a pub.

Frode Øverli has twice received the Sproing Award for Pondus, in 1998 and 2003, and the Adamson Award in 2006.

Characters

Pondus' family 
 Pondus - the main character, a late-thirties, football fanatic family man.
 Beate - Pondus' wife.
 Påsan/Kevin - Pondus' teenage son.
 Sneipen/Frida - Pondus' baby daughter.
 Bjarne - the family's exceptionally stupid dog.

Jokke's family 
 Jokke - Pondus cool friend and a former notoriously pathetic pursuer of ugly women.
 Camilla - Jokke's girlfriend, and the mother of their child. Broke up but are together now.
 Else - Jokke's mother and wife of Günther.
 Günther - Jokke's bald, German midget stepfather.
 Jacobsen - Jokke's father, a former jailbird.
 Gordon - Jokke and Camilla's baby.

Other characters 
 Turid-Laila - a stunning blonde barmaid at Pondus' pub.
 Kjakan - an awkward teenager and Påsan's best friend.
 Harold & Selma - long-time friends of Beate whom Pondus find dull.
 Hugo & Ivar - two (former) colleagues of Pondus with geek interests.
 Reidar - a car mechanic of the greediest sort.
 Roger - an awful comics creator.
 Ponny-Petra - the most notorious of Jokke's female acquaintances.
 Dr. Zimmerknaben - an unorthodox psychiatrist.
 Zlatan -  a black metal-guy who works in Jokke's shop.

Publications

Pondus magazine
The Pondus magazine has been a monthly publication since 2000. The line-up of past and current guest strips are:
Rutetid, also by Øverli, in the one-panel format.
The Duplex by Glenn McCoy
Eon by Lars Lauvik
Holger og Hagbart by Arne Bye
The Flying McCoys by Glenn and Gary McCoy
M by Mads Eriksen
MonoMania by Thomas S. Hansen
Piray by Karine Haaland
Prim by Bodil Revhaug
RedakTom by Tom Ostad
Rocky by Martin Kellerman

Pondus albums
There have so far been 9 digest albums, all but the seventh given football-related titles. English translations appended:
1. Første omgang (2001, Schibsted) First Half
2. Andre omgang (2002, Schibsted) Second Half
3. Hat trick (2003, Schibsted) In reference to football's hat-trick, a 3-goal accomplishment.
4. Flat firer (2004, Schibsted) Flat Four. A reference to the "back four" in soccer, which normally involves four defenders, flat in reference to the defence forming a straight line, to execute an offside trap. The cover displays Pondus playing football, having just "flattened" the opponent player #4.
5. Fem rette (2005, Schibsted) Five Correct. A reference to the Norwegian football pools betting on 12 matches, with prizes awarded for 10, 11, or 12 successful predictions. 5 is a very poor result.
6. 0-6 (2006, Schibsted) In reference to a very poor result for the home team in a football match. In Norwegian it can also mean no sex, or "Zero sex". The cover displays Jokke, the goalkeeper, fumbling the ball to concede a goal, as the foot of an opponent player is bound for Jokke's crotch. In the background, Jokke's girlfriend looks horrified.
7. Sju lange og sju breie (2007, Egmont) Seven Long and Seven Wide, an old Scandinavian expression signifying time which feels like an eternity, and referring to Pondus' old boys football squad of 14 odd-looking men posing on the cover.
8. 8. Divisjon (2008, Egmont) 8. Division, the lowest league level in Norwegian football.
9. Nummer 9 (2009, Egmont) Number 9, referring to Pondus' shirt number, a shirt usually held by top notch strikers.
10. Ti tette og en badehette (2010, Egmont, 978-82-429-4198-5)

See also
 Radio Gaga

Sources

 Pondus dossier Avistegnernes hus 

Footnotes

External links 
 Pondus.no official site and editor's blog 
 Pondus daily strip at Dagbladet 
 Time-lapse video of Øverli drawing a strip
  Rights: Strand Comics

1995 establishments in Norway
1995 comics debuts
Comics characters introduced in 1995
Mascots introduced in 1995
Comics magazines published in Norway
Fictional Norwegian people
Humor comics
Magazine mascots
Male characters in comics
Male characters in advertising
Magazines about comics
Norwegian comic strips
Norwegian comics characters
Magazines established in 1995
Norwegian-language magazines
Satirical comics